Discovery Channel is an Italian television channel.

Discovery Channel was launched on September 1, 1997, on the pay-television platforms TELE+ Digitale and Stream TV and has been exclusive to Sky Italia since its launch in 2003. With the launch of Sky Italia, Discovery quickly branched out by launching the additional channels Discovery Travel & Adventure, Discovery Science and Discovery Civilisation Channel, followed by Animal Planet and Discovery Real Time in 2005.

The present Discovery Channel logo was adopted on April 9, 2019.

A timeshifted version of the channel, called Discovery Channel +1, started on November 10, 2008.

A high-definition simulcast of Discovery Channel started on July 20, 2009. It was the first channel from Discovery EMEA to be simulcasted in both SD and HD.

The sisters channels Discovery World, Discovery Travel & Living and Animal Planet respectively closed on March 1, 2016 (Discovery World; August 11, 2008, as Discovery Civilisation Channel) and February 1, 2019 (Discovery T&L and Animal Planet).

References

Television channels in Italy
Television stations in Switzerland
Italy
Television channels and stations established in 1997
Warner Bros. Discovery EMEA